This is a list of space objects and features which were named after Filipino people and Philippine places.

Asteroids 
 6282 Edwelda
 11697 Estrella
 12088 Macalintal
 12522 Rara

Bennu 

 Amihan Saxum
 Minokawa (crater)

Ceres 

 Binayo (crater)
 Ikapati (crater)
 Ikapati (crater)
 Oltagon (crater)

Mars 

 Bacolor (crater)
 Camiling (crater)
 Daet (crater)
 Naic (crater)
 Solano (crater)
 Taytay (crater)

Mercury 

 Balagtas (crater)
 Bitin Facula
 Rizal (crater)

Rhea 

 Lumawig (crater)
 Pulag Chasma

Titan 

 Kayangan Lacus
 Lanao Lacus
 Mindanao Facula

Venus 

 Darago Fluctus
 Escoda (crater)
 Umaga Valles

References

External links 
 JPL Solar System Dynamics
 Gazetteer of Planetary Nomenclature

Space program of the Philippines
Astronomical nomenclature by nation